The 2012 season was Ulsan Hyundai FC's thirtieth season in the K-League in South Korea. Ulsan Hyundai is competing K-League, Korean FA Cup, AFC Champions League and FIFA Club World Cup.

Current squad

Out on loan

Transfer

In

Out

Coaching staff

Match results

K-League
All times are Korea Standard Time (KST) – UTC+9

League table

Results summary

Results by round

Korean FA Cup

AFC Champions League

Group stage (Group F)

Knockout stage

FIFA Club World Cup

Knockout stage

Squad statistics

Appearances
Statistics accurate as of match played 27 June 2012

Goals and assists

Discipline

Honours

Club
 AFC Champions League Champions, Fair Play Award

Individual
AFC Champions League MVP:  Lee Keun-Ho
AFC Footballer of the Year:  Lee Keun-Ho
AFC Coach of the Year:  Kim Ho-Gon

References

Ulsan Hyundai FC
Ulsan Hyundai FC seasons